"Pony" is a country song performed and written by Kasey Chambers and produced by her brother, Nash Chambers for her third album Wayward Angel (2004). It was released as the album's second single on 16 January 2005 in Australia as CD single. The song became Chambers' third top ten hit on the ARIA Singles Chart. It references Ralph Stanley, an American folk, bluegrass, and country music artist. At the APRA Music Awards of 2006 "Pony" won Most Performed Country Work.

Track listing

Charts

Weekly charts

Year-end charts

References

2004 songs
2005 singles
APRA Award winners
Kasey Chambers songs
Songs written by Kasey Chambers